Hockey Club Gherdëina, also known as HC Gardena, currently named HC Gherdeina valgardena.it due to sponsorship reasons, is an Italian ice hockey team, which plays in the Alps Hockey League, having formerly played in the top division of Italian ice hockey, the Serie A. Originally based in Urtijëi, since 1999 they play their home games at the Pranives Ice Stadium, located in Sëlva, South Tyrol.

Achievements 
Italian League:
Winners (4) : 1969, 1976, 1980, 1981

Notable players

References

External links
 HC Gherdëina Official website 

Ice hockey teams in Italy
Alpenliga teams
1927 establishments in Italy
Ice hockey clubs established in 1927
Inter-National League teams
Sport in South Tyrol